The MTs 6 (МЦ 6) is a Soviet double-barreled high-quality custom hunting and skeet shotgun.

History 
MTs 6 was designed in 1948 by TsKIB SOO and produced by TsKIB SOO and Tulsky Oruzheiny Zavod.

These shotguns were used by Soviet teams in shooting competitions (incl. Olympic Games).

After the model MTs 106 was developed, the production of MTs 6 was discontinued.

Design 
MTs 6 is an over and under hammerless smoothbore 12 gauge shotgun, with one barrel above the other.

It is equipped with safety mechanism and ejector.

All guns have a walnut shoulder stock (with or without cheekpiece) and fore-end, some of them were decorated with engravings.

Variants 
 MTs 6-0 (МЦ 6-0), MTs 6-00 (МЦ 6-00) and MTs 6-03 (МЦ 6-03) - 12 gauge skeet shotguns, 3.4 - 3.6 kg
 MTs 6-12 (МЦ 6-12) - 12 gauge hunting shotgun with 750mm barrels and two triggers, 3.25 - 3.5 kg
 MTs 6-16 (МЦ 6-16) - 16 gauge hunting shotgun with 750mm barrels and two triggers, 3.0 - 3.25 kg
 MTs 6-20 (МЦ 6-20) - 20 gauge hunting shotgun with 750mm barrels and two triggers, 2.75 - 3.0 kg
 MTs 106 (МЦ 106) - next model

References

Sources 
 Основы спортивной охоты (охотминимум) / колл. авт., ред. И. Д. Гулевич. М., Воениздат, 1957. стр.121-122
 Охотничье двуствольное ружьё МЦ 6 // Охотничье, спортивное огнестрельное оружие. Каталог. М., 1958. стр.24-25
 Охотничье двуствольное ружьё МЦ 6 // Спортивно-охотничье оружие и патроны. Бухарест, "Внешторгиздат", 1965. стр.34-37
 Отечественное охотничье оружие. Ружьё МЦ 6 // журнал «Охота и охотничье хозяйство», № 7, июль 1981. стр.29
 Виктор Гуров. Бокфлинты тульских оружейников // журнал "Охота", № 10 (170), 2012. стр.44-50
 Виктор Рон. Великолепная "шестёрка" // журнал "Оружие", № 6, 2012. стр.63-64 - ISSN 1728-9203

Double-barreled shotguns of the Soviet Union
TsKIB SOO products
Tula Arms Plant products